No. 2503 (County of Lincoln) Squadron RAuxAF Regiment is a Royal Auxiliary Air Force RAF Regiment reserve squadron based at RAF Waddington, in Lincolnshire, fairly close to the city of Lincoln and RAF Cranwell. Gunners are recruited both from ex-regulars in the RAF Regiment and civilians in a 50 miles radius surrounding RAF Waddington. The squadron is an infantry squadron in the dismounted close-combat force protection role.

History

The squadron was formed on 1 July 1979 at RAF Scampton to provide force protection to the Vulcans being maintained there at the time; in 1985, the squadron was moved to its current home to provide force sustainment for the regular RAF Regiment. The squadron was deployed to Iraq during the Iraq War as part of Operation Telic, and gunners from the squadron have also been deployed to Germany, the Balkans, Kuwait and Afghanistan as part of Operation Herrick.

The squadron standard was presented on 6 December 2005, backdated to July of the previous year.

Miscellany

In 2015, the squadron was tasked with assisting on an archaeological dig, searching for a lost spitfire.

References

External links
 Main Website

Royal Air Force Regiment squadrons
Military units and formations established in 1979